Jassem Al-Kharafi, (1940 – May 21, 2015) was a Kuwaiti oligarch who was the speaker of the Kuwaiti National Assembly from 1999 to 2011. In his capacity as Speaker in 2006, Al-Kharafi played a critical role in the ascension of Sheikh Sabah Al-Ahmad Al-Sabah to the emirship of Kuwait by coordinating a no-confidence vote of the incumbent emir, Sheikh Saad Al-Abdullah Al-Sabah. During the reign of Sheikh Sabah Al-Ahmad Al-Sabah, his family conglomerate, M.A. Kharafi & Sons, dominated several sectors of the Kuwaiti economy, including construction, telecommunications and investment.

Early life and career
Jassem al-Kharafi was born in Kuwait City in 1940, the son of Mohammed Abdulmohsen al-Kharafi, the founder of M. A. Kharafi & Sons. Al-Kharafi studied Business Administration at the Manchester Trade Faculty in Kuwait and was director of M. A. Kharafi & Sons before being elected to the National Assembly in 1975. He was the Minister of Finance from 1985 to 1990.

Political positions

Views on Iran 
On July 13, 2008, Al-Kharafi publicly accused the West of provoking Iran on the nuclear issue.  In his interview with state-owned Kuwait TV, Al-Kharafi said, "What is happening is that there are provocative Western statements, and Iran responds in the same way...  I believe that a matter this sensitive needs dialogue not escalation, and it shouldn't be dealt with as if Iran were one of America's states."

Criticism of Parliamentary Human Right Committee 
On July 1, 2008, Al-Kharafi criticized the assembly's human rights committee for holding a meeting with US embassy officials without asking permission from the speaker. The meeting occurred on June 30, 2008, to discuss the latest US State Department report that accorded Kuwait a tier three status on trafficking in people for its treatment of domestic helpers and foreign workers. Later, the head of the committee, Waleed Al-Tabtabai, said the meeting was held on the basis of a request by the embassy and that the committee has not "overstepped the authorities of the speaker or the foreign ministry," adding that the committee had received similar requests in the past.

The US embassy officials were reported to have refused to discuss the US decision to freeze the assets of the Revival of Islamic Heritage Society.

Israeli attacks on Lebanon 
In July 2006, he vigorously denounced the Israeli attacks on Lebanon saying that the war would "turn us all into terrorists".

Speaker of Kuwaiti National Assembly 
Al-Kharafi was elected Speaker of the National Assembly in 1999. He served as Speaker for five terms, the most in Kuwait's history, until deciding that he would not stand for reelection in the 2012 National Assembly elections.

Family 
His brother Nasser ran M. A. Kharafi & Sons, and was listed by Forbes as one of the richest people in the world. His sister, Faiza, was rector of Kuwait University. The University of Tirana on 7 October 2011 awarded him an Honoris Causa title.

References

External links
 Kharafi parliament's profile
 A 2003 Interview
 We Are Grateful to the U.S. for Liberating Kuwait but the Americans Are Patronizing aired on Al-Majd TV on 21 January 2007

1940 births
2015 deaths
Finance ministers of Kuwait
Kuwaiti billionaires
Kuwaiti businesspeople
Members of the National Assembly (Kuwait)
Speakers of the National Assembly (Kuwait)
20th-century Kuwaiti businesspeople